Ploskoseminsky is a rural locality (a settlement) and the administrative center of Ploskoseminsky Selsoviet, Rebrikhinsky District, Altai Krai, Russia. The population was 359 as of 2013. There are 4 streets.

Geography 
Ploskoseminsky is located 18 km southeast of Rebrikha (the district's administrative centre) by road. Dalny is the nearest rural locality.

References 

Rural localities in Rebrikhinsky District